This is a glossary of set theory.

Greek

!$@

A

B

C

D

E

F

G

H

I

See proper, below.

J

K

L

M

N

O

P

Q

R

S

T

U

V

W

XYZ

See also
 Glossary of Principia Mathematica
 List of topics in set theory
 Set-builder notation

References

 

Set theory
Set theory
Wikipedia glossaries using description lists